{{Taxobox
| name = Okenia lambat
| image = 
| image_width = 
| image_caption = 
| regnum = Animalia
| phylum = Mollusca
| classis = Gastropoda
| unranked_superfamilia = clade Heterobranchia
clade Euthyneura
clade Nudipleura
clade Nudibranchia
clade Euctenidiacea
clade Doridacea
| superfamilia = Onchidoridoidea
| familia = Goniodorididae
| genus = Okenia
| species = O. lambat
| binomial = Okenia lambat| binomial_authority = Gosliner, 2004
}}Okenia lambat is a species of sea slug, specifically a dorid nudibranch, a marine gastropod mollusc in the family Goniodorididae.

Distribution
This species was described from Luzon Island, Philippines.

Description
This Okenia'' has a broad body and eight pairs of long, pointed, lateral papillae. There is a single papilla on the back, in front of the gills. The body is opaque yellowish white and there is a broken brown band which runs from between the rhinophores to the tail, encircling the back and gills. This band is broken into a crazy paving pattern by thin white lines.

Ecology
The diet of this species is not known.

References

Goniodorididae
Gastropods described in 2004